Kenneth A. Vaudreuil (born 1956) is an American politician who is a Democratic member of the Rhode Island House of Representatives, representing the 57th District since 2007. During the 2009-2010 sessions, he served on the House Committees on Labor, Environment and Natural Resources, Municipal Government, and Small Business, as well as the Permanent Joint Committee on Lottery. He also served as the Deputy Majority Leader. Vaudreuil was defeated in his bid for reelection in the 14 September 2010 Democratic primary to James N. McLaughlin, who went on to win the subsequent November general election.

References

External links
Rhode Island House - Representative Kenneth Vaudreuil official RI House website

Democratic Party members of the Rhode Island House of Representatives
1956 births
Living people
People from Central Falls, Rhode Island